Oran Park is a suburb of south-west Sydney, within the Macarthur Region, in the state of New South Wales, Australia in Camden Council.

History
The area now known as Oran Park was originally home to the Muringong, southernmost of the Darug people. In 1805 John Macarthur established his property at Camden where he raised merino sheep. The Oran Park Town housing development replaced Oran Park Raceway, which stood from 1962 – 2010. The circuit hosted the Australian Grand Prix in its pre-Formula One era and rounds of the Australian Touring Car Championship, later known as the Supercars Championship.

Heritage listings
Oran Park has a number of heritage-listed sites, including:
 112-130 Oran Park Drive: Oran Park (homestead)

Commercial Area 
Oran Park has a shopping centre named Oran Park Podium.

Population 
Other languages spoken at home included Punjabi 3.8%, Hindi 2.9%, Nepali 2.7% and Spanish 2.3%, The most common responses for religious affiliation were Catholic 28.9%, No Religion 19.8%, Hinduism 9.7%, Anglican 8.3% and Anglican 8.3%. Top ancestries include Australian (23%), English (18.8%), Indian (8.8%), Italian (6.9%) and Irish (4.3%).

Governance 
Oran Park is part of the north ward of Camden Council represented by David Funnell (currently deputy mayor of Camden), Cindy Cagney and Peter Johnson. Chris Patterson is currently the local mayor. The suburb is contained within the federal electorate of Macarthur, represented by  Mike Freelander of the Labor Party, and the state electorate of Camden, currently held by Peter Sidgreaves of the Liberal Party.

References

External links
  [CC-By-SA]

 
Suburbs of Sydney